The 1986 Singapore Women's Open was a women's tennis tournament played on indoor hard courts in Singapore and was part of the Category 1 tier of the 1986 Virginia Slims World Championship Series. It was the inaugural edition of the Singapore Women's Open and was held from 20 October through 26 October 1986. Sixth-seeded Gigi Fernández won the singles title.

Finals

Singles
 Gigi Fernández defeated  Mercedes Paz 6–4, 2–6, 6–4
 It was Fernández' first singles title of her career.

Doubles
 Anna-Maria Fernandez /  Julie Richardson defeated  Sandy Collins /  Sharon Walsh 6–3, 6–2
 It was Fernandez' 1st doubles title of the year and the 3rd of her career. It was Richardson's 1st doubles title of the year and the 2nd of her career.

References

External links
 ITF tournament edition details

Singapore Open
WTA Singapore Open
1986 in Singaporean sport
Women's sports competitions in Singapore